Senator Ackerson may refer to:

Henry E. Ackerson Jr. (1880–1970), New Jersey State Senate
Jon Ackerson (born 1943), Kentucky State Senate